Cell Communication and Signaling is a peer-reviewed and open access scientific journal that publishes original research, reviews and commentaries with a focus on cellular signaling research. It was established in 2003 and is currently published by the London-based publisher BioMed Central.

Stephan M. Feller (Weatherall Institute of Molecular Medicine, University of Oxford) has been the editor-in-chief of Cell Communication and Signaling since April 2008. In June 2012, Cell Communication and Signaling received its first impact factor.

References

BioMed Central academic journals
Open access journals